Gordon Mitchell (26 May 1865 – 30 July 1896) was a Scotland international rugby union player.

Rugby union career

Amateur career
Mitchell played for West of Scotland. He went on to captain the club. His time there was noted by the Dundee Evening Telegraph as 'one of the most brilliant in the history of the club'.

Provincial career
Mitchell played for Glasgow District in the inter-city matches of  1883 and 1884 and 1885.

He was also capped for West of Scotland District in their match against East of Scotland District in January 1885 and 1886.

He captained the West side in January 1887.

International career
He was capped three times for Scotland in 1885.

The Dundee Evening Telegraph noted that 'Mitchell was a typical Scottish forward in as much as his play was a combination of physical prowess and brain power'.

Administrative career
Mitchell became the 18th President of the Scottish Rugby Union. He served the 1890–91 term in office.

Death
Mitchell died on his way back from to Scotland from Inhambane, Mozambique. His obituary notes that he was an all-round sportsman with a talent, not only for rugby union, but for both cricket and running. However it goes on to say that he was not interested in either: he did not practise cricket and rarely 'donned his spikes' to run.

References

1865 births
1896 deaths
People educated at Craigmount School
Rugby union players from Hamilton, South Lanarkshire
Scottish rugby union players
Scotland international rugby union players
Presidents of the Scottish Rugby Union
Glasgow District (rugby union) players
West of Scotland District (rugby union) players
West of Scotland FC players
Rugby union forwards